Archduchess Maria of Austria (21 June 1528 – 26 February 1603) was the empress consort and queen consort of Maximilian II, Holy Roman Emperor, King of Bohemia and Hungary.  She served as regent of Spain in the absence of her father Emperor Charles V from 1548 until 1551 and was one of the most powerful empresses of the Holy Roman Empire.

Early life

Maria was born in Madrid, Spain to Charles V, Holy Roman Emperor and King of Spain, and Isabella of Portugal.   
She grew up mostly between Toledo and Valladolid with her siblings, Philip and Joanna.    They built a strong family bond despite their father's regular absences. Maria and her brother, Philip, shared similar strong personal views and policies which they retained during the rest of their lives.

As Regent of Spain

On 15 September 1548, aged twenty, she married her first cousin Archduke Maximilian. The couple had sixteen children during the course of a twenty-eight-year marriage.

While her father was occupied with German affairs, Maria and Maximilian acted as regents of Spain from 1548 to 1551 during the absence of Prince Philip. Maria stayed at the Spanish court until August 1551, and in 1552, the couple moved to live at the court of Maximilian's father in Vienna.

In 1558, Maria returned to Madrid and acted as regent of Spain during the absence of her brother, now King Philip II, from 1558 to 1561.

As Holy Roman Empress

After her return to Germany, her husband eventually succeeded his father Ferdinand I, at his death, as ruler of Germany, Bohemia and Hungary, which he ruled from 1564 to his death in 1576.

Maria was a devout Catholic and frequently disagreed with her religiously ambiguous husband about his religious tolerance.

During her life in Austria, Maria was reportedly ill at ease in a country which was not entirely Catholic, and she surrounded herself with a circle of strictly Catholic courtiers, many of whom she had brought with her from Spain. Her court was organized by her Spanish chief lady-in-waiting Maria de Requenes in a Spanish manner, and among her favorite companions was her Spanish lady-in-waiting Margarita de Cardona.

As Holy Roman Empress Dowager
In 1576, Maximilian died. Maria remained at the Imperial Court for six years after his death.  She had great influence over her sons, the future emperors Rudolf and Matthias.

Maria returned to Spain in 1582, taking her youngest surviving child Archduchess Margaret with her, promised to marry Philip II of Spain, who had lost his fourth wife, her oldest daughter, Archduchess Anna in 1580. 

Margaret finally refused and took the veil as a Poor Clare. Commenting that she was very happy to live in "a country without heretics", Maria then influenced quite a number of events in the Spanish Court until she eventually settled in the Convent of Las Descalzas Reales in Madrid, where she lived until her death in 1603.

She was the patron of the noted Spanish composer Tomás Luis de Victoria, and the great Requiem Mass he wrote in 1603 for her funeral is considered among the best and most refined of his works.
Maria exerted some influence together with Queen Margaret, the wife of her grandson/nephew, Philip III of Spain. Margaret, the sister of the future Emperor Ferdinand II, would be one of three women at Philip's court who would apply considerable influence over the king. Margaret was considered by contemporaries to be extremely pious – in some cases, excessively pious, and too influenced by the Church, and 'astute and very skillful' in her political dealings, although 'melancholic' and unhappy over the influence of the Duke of Lerma over her husband at court. Margaret continued to fight an ongoing battle with Lerma for influence until her death in 1611. Philip had an 'affectionate, close relationship' with Margaret, and paid her additional attention after she bore him a son, also named Philip, in 1605.

Maria, the Austrian representative to the Spanish court – and Margaret of the Cross, Maria's daughter – along with queen Margaret, were a powerful Catholic and pro-Austrian faction in the court of Philip III of Spain. They were successful, for example, in convincing Philip to provide financial support to Ferdinand from 1600 onwards. Philip steadily acquired other religious advisors. Father Juan de Santa Maria, the confessor to Philip's daughter, Maria Anna, was felt by contemporaries to have an excessive influence over Philip at the end of his life, and both he and Luis de Aliaga, Philip's own confessor, were credited with the overthrow of Lerma in 1618.   Similarly Mariana de San Jose, a favoured nun of Queen Margaret's, was also criticised for her later influence over the King's actions.

Children
Maria and Maximilian had sixteen children of whom only five were still alive at the time of her death:
Anna of Austria (2 November 1549 – 26 October 1580), married her uncle Philip II of Spain
Ferdinand of Austria (28 March 1551 – 16 June 1552)
Rudolf II, Holy Roman Emperor (18 July 1552 – 20 January 1612)
Archduke Ernest of Austria (15 June 1553 – 12 February 1595), served as Governor of the Low Countries
Elisabeth of Austria (1554-1592) (5 July 1554 – 22 January 1592), married Charles IX of France
Maria of Austria (27 July 1555 – 28 June 1556)
Matthias, Holy Roman Emperor (24 February 1557 – 20 March 1619)
A son (born and died 20 October 1557)
Maximilian III, Archduke of Austria (12 October 1558 – 2 November 1618), served as grandmaster of the Teutonic Order and Administrator of Prussia
Albert VII, Archduke of Austria (15 November 1559 – 13 July 1621), served as Governor of the Low Countries
Archduke Wenceslaus of Austria (9 March 1561 – 22 September 1578)
Frederick of Austria (21 June 1562 – 25 January 1563)
Maria of Austria (19 February 1564 – 26 March 1564)
Charles of Austria (26 September 1565 Vienna – 23 May 1566)
Archduchess Margaret of Austria (1567–1633) (25 January 1567 – 5 July 1633), a nun
Eleanor of Austria (4 November 1568 – 12 March 1580)

Ancestry

Notes

References
 http://www.guide2womenleaders.com/womeninpower/Womeninpower1540.htm

|-

|-

|-

|-

|-

16th-century women rulers
16th-century House of Habsburg
16th-century viceregal rulers
Holy Roman Empresses
German queens consort
Hungarian queens consort
Bohemian queens consort
Austrian royal consorts
Austrian princesses
Spanish infantas
1528 births
1603 deaths
Regents of Spain
16th-century women of the Holy Roman Empire
Spanish people of Austrian descent
Daughters of emperors
Children of Charles V, Holy Roman Emperor
Daughters of kings
Queen mothers